The Competition and Consumer Protection Commission (CCPC) is the Competition regulator in Ireland. It is an Irish state agency established in 2014, combining the previous functions of the Competition Authority and the National Consumer Agency. The amalgamation was effected by the Fine Gael–Labour coalition government as part of a reduction in state spending in response to the post-2008 Irish economic downturn; the new body also has increased powers.

References

External links
 

2014 establishments in Ireland
Government agencies of the Republic of Ireland
Competition regulators
Consumer rights agencies
Regulation in Ireland
Department of Enterprise, Trade and Employment